The Loyola Ramblers (also called the Loyola Chicago Ramblers) are the varsity sports teams of Loyola University Chicago. Most teams compete in the Atlantic 10 Conference, which the school joined in 2022 after leaving the Missouri Valley Conference. They previously played in the Horizon League. Notable athletes from Loyola have included middle-distance runner Tom O'Hara, volleyball player Thomas Jaeschke, and basketball players Mike Novak, Jerry Harkness, Les Hunter, Wayne Sappleton, Alfredrick Hughes, LaRue Martin, and Blake Schilb. The nickname "Ramblers" was first used in 1926. The Loyola Ramblers departed from the Missouri Valley Conference and joined the Atlantic 10 Conference effective July 1, 2022.

Conference affiliation history
Loyola Chicago was a charter member of the Midwestern City Conference when it was established on June 16, 1979. The intercollegiate athletic circuit eventually rebranded twice, first as the Midwestern Collegiate Conference in 1985 and then the Horizon League on June 4, 2001. The university announced on April 12, 2013 that it was leaving the Horizon League to replace Creighton as the tenth member of the Missouri Valley Conference (MVC) beginning  months later on July 1. Prior to the conclusion of its nine years in the MVC, the Ramblers were accepted by the Atlantic 10 Conference (A-10) on November 16, 2021 as its 15th member beginning July 1, 2022. The women's golf team competes in the Metro Atlantic Athletic Conference (MAAC).

Sports sponsored

A member of the Missouri Valley Conference, Loyola University Chicago sponsors teams in seven men's and eight women's NCAA sanctioned sports.

Football was discontinued at Loyola after the 1930 season.

National championships
 Men's basketball 1963
 Men's volleyball 2014, 2015

Men's baseball
Phil Weintraub, later a Major League Baseball player, played for the Loyola baseball team.

Men's basketball

Loyola Ramblers men's basketball has played at the Joseph J. Gentile Arena since 1996; before then they played home games at Alumni Gym. The 1962–1963 team, led by coach George Ireland, won the 1963 NCAA University Division basketball tournament (predecessor to the current Division I men's tournament), defeating the University of Cincinnati 60–58 in the title game. Vic Rouse tipped in the winning bucket in overtime to win the game. During their tournament run, the Ramblers also won a historically notable game against Mississippi State, an all-white team that defied a state court order in order to play said game. The Ramblers made it back to the regional semifinals the following year and qualified for the tournament in 1966 and 1968. They would not make the national tournament again until 1985, in which they lost to eventual tournament runner-up Georgetown in the Sweet Sixteen. In 2018, the Ramblers returned to the tournament for the first time in 33 years. As a No. 11 seed, they upset No. 6 seed Miami (FL) and No. 3 seed Tennessee to qualify for the Sweet Sixteen. They faced Nevada in the regional semifinal and defeated the Wolf Pack 69-68 to advance to the Elite 8 against Kansas State. They advanced to the Final Four by beating Kansas State 78-62. In the Final Four, they lost to Michigan 69-57.

Loyola made it to the finals of the National Invitation Tournament in 1939 and 1949 and qualified for 1962 and 1980 tournaments. They won the College Basketball Invitational in 2015.

Men's volleyball

Loyola Ramblers men's volleyball was coached by Loyola alumnus Shane Davis.  His record through twelve seasons is 265–88.

Now they are coached by Mark Hulse.

In 2013, the Ramblers were defeated by the UCI Anteaters 0–3 (24–26, 18–25, 27–29) in the first semifinal of the NCAA championships on May 2, 2013 at UCLA's Pauley Pavilion. This was the team's first appearance ever in an NCAA men's collegiate volleyball tournament.

On May 3, 2014, Loyola, playing host to the 2014 Championships, defeated the Stanford Cardinal 3-1 to win the program's first-ever NCAA Men's National Collegiate Volleyball Championship.

Loyola successfully defended their championship in 2015, defeating Lewis 3-2 at Stanford's Maples Pavilion.

Facilities

Loyola does not have local competition sites for cross country, golf, or track and field.

References

External links